William Trevor Rowlands (7 May 1904 – 18 May 1984) was an Australian rules footballer who played with Collingwood in the Victorian Football League (VFL). He was also a cricketer and played six first-class matches for Western Australia between 1937/38 and 1938/39.

Family
One of the seven children of Rev. Lewis Jones Rowlands (1856-1934), a Welsh-born Methodist minister, and Annie Rowlands (1864-1940), née Dixon, Trevor Rowlands was born at Echuca, Victoria, on 7 May 1904.

He married Dorothy Esther Elizabeth Solomon (1906-2006) at West Perth on 7 January 1936.

Sports master
Rowlands was appointed sports master at Hale School, in Perth, Western Australia in 1930.

Military service
He served in the Second AIF during World War II.

See also
 List of Western Australia first-class cricketers

References

Sources
 
 World War Two Nominal Roll: Lieutenant William Trevor Rowlands (WX19026), Department of Veterans' Affairs.
 B883, WX19026: World War Two Service Record: Lieutenant William Trevor Rowlands (WX19026), National Archives of Australia.

External links 

 
 William Trevor (Trevor) Rowlands, at WAFL Footy Facts.
 Trevor Rowlands's profile at Collingwood Forever.

1904 births
1984 deaths
People from Echuca
Australian rules footballers from Victoria (Australia)
University Blacks Football Club players
Collingwood Football Club players
Perth Football Club players
Australian cricketers
Western Australia cricketers